The 2004 Six Nations Championship was the fifth series of the rugby union Six Nations Championship to be held since the competition expanded in 2000 to include Italy. Overall, this was the 110th series of the international championship. 

Match winners received two points, with one for a draw and none for a loss. The first tiebreaker was points difference.

France won the competition, also winning the Grand Slam. Ireland won the Triple Crown, sweeping their matches against Wales, England and Scotland. Scotland were whitewashed, earning the wooden spoon as a result.

Participants
The teams involved were:

Squads

Table

Results

Round 1

Round 2

Round 3

 Ireland won at Twickenham for the first time since 1994.
 This was England's first defeat at Twickenham since losing 30–16 to New Zealand during the 1999 Rugby World Cup.

Round 4

 This was the first time since 1961 that France had kept a clean sheet against Scotland.

Round 5

England needed to win by eight points to win the Championship.

References

 
2004 rugby union tournaments for national teams
2004
2003–04 in European rugby union
2003–04 in Irish rugby union
2003–04 in English rugby union
2003–04 in Welsh rugby union
2003–04 in Scottish rugby union
2003–04 in French rugby union
2003–04 in Italian rugby union
February 2004 sports events in Europe
March 2004 sports events in Europe